The Texas Renaissance Festival (dubbed the Ren Fest) is an annual Renaissance fair located in Todd Mission, Texas, about 55 miles northwest of Houston.

The Texas Renaissance Festival (TRF) started in 1974 on the location of an old strip mining site. The festival claims to be "the nation’s largest Renaissance theme park." As of 2017, the festival sits on 55 acres of land, and offers over 200 acres of camping facilities to patrons. The festival regularly draws over half a million guests annually, making it the largest Renaissance festival in the country by attendance.

History

The TRF was founded in 1974 by brothers, George and David Coulam, on an abandoned strip mining site in what is now Todd Mission, Texas. At the time, it spanned fifteen acres, with three stages featuring small improv theatre groups, and merchants selling their goods on blankets. The opening year saw a turn-out of 33,000.

Features
As of 2017, the TRF features approximately 500 costumed actors who perform on 25 stages. Its 350 on-site shops include: international food purveyors; unique artisans; merchants and craft vendors; human-powered rides; an abundance of performers walking among the guests; and the Queen's Royal Finale (fireworks if weather permits) at dusk. The fair hosts over half a million visitors annually, which peaked at 679,000 in 2016.

Themed weekends

Each of the nine weekends of the festival take on a different theme, influencing the performances, costumes, food, drink, art, shops, contests, and games throughout the festival grounds.
Oktoberfest - German theme, including polka music and dancing, and the serving of traditional German beer.
1001 Dreams - Fantasy theme, encouraging lavish costumes of wizards, fairies, and elves and including several fantastical contests, such as scavenger hunts and costume contests.
All Hallows Eve - Medieval Halloween theme, including spooky decorations and contests, such as jack-o-lantern carving contests, to celebrate the holiday.
Pirate Adventure - Pirate theme, encouraging pirate costumes and including several sea-related games and contests.
Roman Bacchanal - Roman theme, encouraging Roman costumes and hosting several Roman-themed contests and games such as toga contests and spaghetti eating contests.
Barbarian Invasion - Medieval Barbarian theme, encouraging costumes of medieval barbarians and including "barbaric" contests such as the "Barbarian Battle Cry" contest and eating contests.
Heroes and Villains - Iconic figures of the past come to life.
Highland Fling - Scottish theme, encouraging traditional Scottish costumes and including bagpipe-playing and traditional Scottish food and drink.
Celtic Christmas - Christmas theme, including Christmas decorations and music, and featuring Christmas-themed contests such as "Candy Cane Hunt" and "Guess the Present" contests.

Performances
The festival grounds feature 25 stages, which host a wide variety of performances. The festival features several medieval-themed music and dance groups, including everything from belly dancing, to harps and fiddles, to bagpipes and accordions, to the carillon.  Throughout the festival park several demonstrating artists can be found presenting the methods of various medieval trades, such as glassblowing, forging armor, candle-making, coin minting, and others to visitors.

On the larger stages, other, grander events take place, the largest of which is the Joust. The Joust is performed by the Hanlon-Lees Action Theatre, and is an accurate reenactment of a medieval joust, featuring authentic weapons, costumed horses, and armored knights.  Other performances at the festival include acts designed for mature audiences only; as well as for youngsters. Staple performances include The Birds of Prey show, a highly praised free-flying bird show including hawks, owls, vultures, and eagles, the Fire Whip Show, the Clan Tynker Family Circus, the Pride of Bedlam, and the School of Sword.

At the end of the festival, a royal finale takes place in the arena, featuring performances from several of the entertainers and musicians, and closing with a fireworks presentation.

See also
List of Renaissance fairs

References

External links 

 
 Texas Renaissance Festival Beefeaters
 Map of festival grounds

Festivals in Texas
Tourist attractions in Grimes County, Texas
Renaissance fairs